Bob Lutz and Stan Smith were the defending champions but withdrew from the tournament.
Jimmy Connors and Ilie Năstase won in the final 6–4, 7–6 against Tom Okker and Marty Riessen.

Seeds

Draw

Finals

Top half

Section 1

Section 2

Bottom half

Section 3

Section 4

References

External links
 ATP main draw
1975 US Open – Men's draws and results at the International Tennis Federation

Men's doubles
US Open (tennis) by year – Men's doubles